The Chieftains are a traditional Irish folk band formed in Dublin in  1962, by Paddy Moloney, Seán Potts and Michael Tubridy. Their sound, which is almost entirely instrumental and largely built around uilleann pipes, has become synonymous with traditional Irish music. They are regarded as having helped popularise Irish music around the world. They have won six Grammy Awards during their career and they were given a Lifetime Achievement Award at the 2002 BBC Radio 2 Folk Awards. Some music experts have credited The Chieftains with bringing traditional Irish music to a worldwide audience, so much so that the Irish government awarded them the honorary title of 'Ireland's Musical Ambassadors' in 1989.

Name
The band's name came from the book Death of a Chieftain by Irish author John Montague. Assisted early on by Garech Browne, they signed with his company Claddagh Records. They needed financial success abroad, and succeeded in this.

Career

Origins
Paddy Moloney was a member of Ceoltóirí Chualann, a group of musicians who specialised in instrumentals, and sought to form a new band. Their first rehearsals were held at Moloney's house, with David Fallon and Martin Fay joining the original three. The group remained only semi-professional until the 1970s. By then, they had achieved great success in Ireland and the United Kingdom.

Rise to international fame
In 1973, their popularity began to spread to the United States when their previous albums were released there by Island Records. They received further acclaim when they worked on the Academy Award–winning soundtrack to Stanley Kubrick's 1975 film Barry Lyndon, which triggered their transition to the mainstream in the US.

Successful career
The group continued to release successful records throughout the 1970s and 1980s, and their work with Van Morrison in 1988 resulted in the critically acclaimed album Irish Heartbeat. They went on to collaborate with many other well-known musicians and singers; among them Luciano Pavarotti, the Rolling Stones, Madonna, Sinéad O'Connor, Roger Daltrey, and Van Morrison.

50th anniversary
In 2012, they celebrated their 50th anniversary with an ambitious album and tour. The album, Voice of Ages, was produced by T-Bone Burnett and featured the Chieftains collaborating with many musicians including Bon Iver, Paolo Nutini and The Decemberists. It also included a collaboration with NASA astronaut Catherine Coleman playing the flute aboard the International Space Station as it orbited the earth. The Chieftains performed at Carnegie Hall on March 17, 2012.

The Irish Goodbye Tour
In February 2019, The Chieftains embarked on an extensive farewell tour entitled the "Irish Goodbye Tour", including a 2019 European leg, a 2020 Canadian leg and two 2019 and 2020 US legs.
 
On 13 March 2020, the band announced that a few tour dates of their "Irish Goodbye Tour" had been postponed (until further notice) due to the COVID-19 pandemic.

2021: Paddy Moloney's death
The Chieftains' co-founder and leader Paddy Moloney suddenly died on 12 October 2021, leaving uncertain the band's future.

2022: Live in San Francisco 1973 & 1976
On 23 July 2022, in celebration of the band's 60 years, it was announced the forthcoming release on 2 September 2022 on vinyl, CD, and digital downloads of Bear's Sonic Journals: The Foxhunt, The Chieftains Live in San Francisco 1973 & 1976 featuring the Chieftains performing live in San Francisco in 1973 and 1976. The 2CD & Digital editions of the album feature the recordings of two entire shows in San Francisco: on October 1, 1973 at The Boarding House during their first tour in the U.S. (an unscheduled gig which occurred at Jerry Garcia's invitation to open for his bluegrass band, Old & In the Way) and on May 5, 1976 at The Great American Music Hall, while the vinyl release features 2 sides containing (only) the performance from October 1, 1973.

Collaborations

The band has become known for their vast work of collaborations with popular musicians of many genres, including country music, Galician traditional music, Newfoundland music, and rock and roll.  Their widespread work as collaborators resulted in the Irish Government awarding the group the honorary title of Ireland's Musical Ambassadors in 1989.

They have performed with (in alphabetical order):

In May 1986, they performed at Self Aid, a benefit concert held in Dublin that focused on the problem of chronic unemployment which was widespread in Ireland at that time. In 1994, they appeared in Roger Daltrey's production, album and video of A Celebration: The Music of Pete Townshend and The Who. They performed with Canadian astronaut Cmdr. Chris Hadfield in Houston, Texas, on 15 February 2013. Hadfield sang and played guitar on "Moondance" from aboard the International Space Station.

Success and legacy
The band has won six Grammy Awards and been nominated eighteen times. They have won an Emmy and a Genie and contributed tracks, including their highly praised version of the song Women of Ireland, to Leonard Rosenman's Oscar-winning score for Stanley Kubrick's 1975 film Barry Lyndon. In 2002 they were given a Lifetime Achievement Award by the UK's BBC Radio 2. Two of their singles have been minor hits in the UK Singles Chart. "Have I Told You Lately" (credited to The Chieftains with Van Morrison) reached No. 71 in 1995. "I Know My Love" (credited to The Chieftains featuring The Corrs) reached No. 37 in 1999.

Dr. Gearóid Ó hAllmhuráin said the success of The Chieftains helped place Irish traditional music on a par with other musical genres in the world of popular entertainment. By collaborating with pop and rock musicians, they have taken Irish music to a much wider audience. They have become, in effect, musical ambassadors for Ireland. This de facto role was officially recognised by the Irish government in 1989 when it awarded the group the honorary title of Ireland's Musical Ambassadors.

Notable performances
They played in a concert for Pope John Paul II, before an audience of more than one million people in 1979 in Phoenix Park in Dublin, to mark the Papal visit to Ireland.

In 1983, they were invited by the Chinese Government to perform with the Chinese Broadcasting Art Group in a concert on the Great Wall of China, becoming the first western musical group to do so. They were the first group to perform in the Capitol Building in Washington, D.C., invited by Senator Edward Kennedy and the former Speaker of the House, Tip O'Neill.

In 2011, they performed at a concert in Dublin attended by President Mary McAleese and Queen Elizabeth II of Britain during her first ever official trip to the Republic of Ireland.

Personnel

 Current members
 Kevin Conneff – bodhrán, vocals (1976–present)
 Matt Molloy – flute, tin whistle (1979–present)

 Former members
 Paddy Moloney – uilleann pipes, tin whistle, button accordion, bodhrán (1962–2021; died 2021)
 Seán Potts – tin whistle, bones, bodhrán (1962–1979; died 2014)
 Michael Tubridy – flute, concertina, tin whistle (1962–1979)
 David Fallon – bodhrán (1962–1966)
 Martin Fay – fiddle, bones (1962–2002; died 2012)
 Peadar Mercier – bodhrán, bones (1966–1976; died 1991)
 Seán Keane – fiddle, tin whistle (1968–2002; occasional performances thereafter)
 Derek Bell – Irish harp, keyboard instruments, oboe (1975–2002; died 2002)
 Ronnie McShane – bones, bodhrán (1975–1976; died 2017)

 Touring musicians
 Tim Edey – guitars, melodeon/button accordion, piano, backing vocals 
 Seamie O'Dowd – guitars, accordion (replacing Tim Edey when he is not touring?)
 Triona Marshall – keyboards, harp
 Tara Breen – fiddle, saxophone, step dancing 
 Alyth McCormack – vocals, step dancing 
 Jon Pilatzke – fiddle, step dancing 
 Nathan Pilatzke – step dancing 
 Cara Butler – step dancing

Discography

 The Chieftains (1964)
 The Chieftains 2 (1969)
 The Chieftains 3 (1971)
 The Chieftains 4 (1973)
 The Chieftains 5 (1975)
 The Chieftains 6: Bonaparte's Retreat (1976)
 The Chieftains 7 (1977)
 The Chieftains Live!  (1977, live)
 The Chieftains 8 (1978)
 The Chieftains 9: Boil the Breakfast Early (1979)
 The Chieftains 10: Cotton-Eyed Joe (1980)
 The Grey Fox (1982) (soundtrack to The Grey Fox)
 The Year of the French (1983, with the RTÉ Concert Orchestra)
 The Chieftains in China (1985)
 Ballad of the Irish Horse (1986)
 Celtic Wedding (1987)
 In Ireland (1987) (with James Galway)
 Irish Heartbeat (1988) (with Van Morrison)
 The Tailor of Gloucester (1988) (with Meryl Streep)
 A Chieftains Celebration (1989)
 Over the Sea To Skye: The Celtic Connection (1990) (with James Galway)
 The Bells of Dublin (1991)
 Reel Music (1991)
 Another Country (1992)
 An Irish Evening (1992, live)
 The Best of the Chieftains (1992, compilation)
 Far and Away original motion picture soundtrack (with John Williams) (1992)
 The Celtic Harp: A Tribute to Edward Bunting (1993) (with The Belfast Harp Orchestra)
 The Long Black Veil (1995)
 Film Cuts (1996)
 Santiago (1996)
 Long Journey Home (1998, with the Irish Film Orchestra and Elvis Costello)
 Fire in the Kitchen (1998, compilation)
 Silent Night: A Christmas in Rome (1998, live)
 Tears of Stone (1999)
 Water From the Well (2000)
 The Wide World Over (2002, compilation)
 Down the Old Plank Road: The Nashville Sessions (2002)
 Further Down the Old Plank Road (2003)
 Live from Dublin: A Tribute to Derek Bell (2005, live)
 The Essential Chieftains (2006, compilation)
 San Patricio (2010) (with Ry Cooder)
 Voice of Ages (2012)
 Bear’s Sonic Journals: The Foxhunt, The Chieftains Live in San Francisco 1973 & 1976 (2022)

Explanatory notes

Citations

General sources

External links

 Official website
 Band history
 The Chieftains, National Geographic World Music (archived)
 
 

Celtic music groups
Claddagh Records artists
Grammy Award winners
Irish folk musical groups
Island Records artists
Musical groups established in 1962
Musical groups from Dublin (city)
RCA Records artists
Van Morrison
1962 establishments in Ireland